Events in the year 1955 in Portugal.

Incumbents
President: Francisco Craveiro Lopes
Prime Minister: António de Oliveira Salazar

Events
United Nations Security Council Resolution 109: Portugal and several other countries are admitted to membership to the United Nations

Arts and entertainment

Sports
AD Fundão founded
Liga Feminina de Basquetebol founded

Births

27 January – Maria do Carmo Seabra, politician
28 February – Rui Reininho, singer
30 June – Luís Santos, chess player and International Correspondence Chess Grandmaster
25 July – Miguel Esteves Cardoso, writer, translator, critic and journalist
29 August – Francisco Lopes, politician
1 November – Amarilis de Varennes, academic

Deaths

3 January – José Norton de Matos, military officer and politician (born 1867)
27 June
Victor Hugo de Azevedo Coutinho, politician, Prime Minister 1914–15 (born 1871)
Artur de Oliveira Santos, journalist and local politician (born 1884)
27 November – Luís de Freitas Branco, composer (born 1890)
13 December – António Egas Moniz, neurologist, winner of the Nobel Prize for Physiology or Medicine (1949) (born 1874).

References

 
1950s in Portugal
Years of the 20th century in Portugal
Portugal
Portugal